This is a list of current  ambassadors from  Indonesia.

Current Indonesian ambassadors

Ambassadors to international organizations 

Current ambassadors from Indonesia to international organizations:

See also 

 Foreign relations of Indonesia
 List of diplomatic missions of Indonesia

Notes and references 

Ambassadors
Lists of ambassadors by country of origin